Joan Helene Hambidge (born 11 September 1956 in Aliwal North, South Africa) (the English surname notwithstanding), is an Afrikaans poet, literary theorist and academic.  She is a prolific poet in Afrikaans, controversial as a public figure and critic and notorious for her out-of-the-closet style of writing.  Her theoretic contributions deal mainly with Roland Barthes, deconstruction, postmodernism, psychoanalysis and metaphysics.

Biography
Hambidge studied at the University of Stellenbosch and the University of Pretoria. She was admitted to a doctorate under André P. Brink at Rhodes University in 1985. A second doctorate followed (University of Cape Town, 2001).

Although Hambidge says she discovered her muse when she was young, it was while she was a lecturer at the University of the North, Limpopo Province, South Africa, that she started to blossom as a writer.

She was awarded the Eugène Marais Prize for literature for her second volume of poetry, Bitterlemoene ("Bitter Oranges"), in 1986. This prize is one of the most coveted literary prizes in South Africa.  She also won the Litera Prize as well as the Poetry Institute of Africa Prize for her poetry.

She is currently a professor at the School of Languages and Literatures at the University of Cape Town.

Her major creative works
Although she writes in Afrikaans, Hambidge has translated some of her poetry into English. Other translations have been done by Jo Nel, fellow poet and close friend Johann de Lange, and Charl JF Cilliers.  Her work has been published in the Netherlands and the UK as well as in the US. Having published 26 volumes of poetry up to 2016 she is the most prolific poet in Afrikaans.

Hambidge's interest in literary theory (especially psychoanalysis and metafiction) is reflected in her writing, especially in her fiction. She works with the difference between theory and practice in her novels, Judaskus ("Judas kiss", 1998) and "Kladboek" (2008). She has also published two theoretical works: Postmodernisme (1995), about Roland Barthes, deconstruction and post-modernism, and Psigoanalise en lees ("Psychoanalysis and reading", 1991), on Jacques Lacan and reading.

Other contributions
Hambidge is a prolific traveller and writes a weekly column for a Cape Town daily, Die Burger. She is a critic and columnist for the Afrikaans literary e-zine Litnet.

Literary style
Hambidge is famous for her iconoclastic and irreverent approach to literary traditions in Afrikaans and cultural idols and for her re-examination of previously taboo subjects.  She is also the first Afrikaans author to have dealt with lesbianism from an insider's point of view.  She imposes a humorous and satirical twist on most of the subjects she tackles.

Volumes of poetry
 Hartskrif (1985) ("Heart Script")
 Bitterlemoene (1986) ("Bitter oranges")
 Die anatomie van melancholie (1987) ("The anatomy of melancholy")
 Palinodes (1987)
 Geslote baan (1988) ("Closed circuit")
 Donker labirint (1989) ("Dark labyrinth")
 Gesteelde appels (1989) ("Stolen apples")
 Kriptonemie (1989) ("Cryptonomy")
 Verdraaide raaisels (1990) ("Twisted riddles")
 Die somber muse (1990) ("The sombre muse")
 Tachycardia (1990)
 Die verlore simbool (1991) ("The lost symbol")
 Interne verhuising (1995) ("Internal house moving")
 Ewebeeld (1997) ("Mirror image")
 Lykdigte (2000) ("Memorial poems")
 Ruggespraak (2002) ("Talking back")
 Die buigsaamheid van verdriet (2005) ("The flexibility of sorrow")
 En skielik is dit aand (2006) ("And suddenly it's evening")
 Dad (2006)
 Koesnaatjies vir die proe (2008)
 Vuurwiel (2009) ("Wheel of fire")
 Visums by verstek (2011) ("Visas by default")
 Lot se vrou (2012) ("Lot's wife")
 Meditasies (2013) ("Meditations")
 Matriks (2016) ("Matrix")
 Indeks (2016) ("Index")

Novels
 Swart Koring (1996) ("Black Wheat") (Parody on the pulp romance novel, with a lesbian twist)
 Die Swart Sluier (1998) ("The black veil") (Parody on pulp detective novels and ghost stories)
 Judaskus (1998) ("Judas Kiss")
 Sewe Sonjas en wat hulle gedoen het (2001) ("Seven Sonyas and what they did") (An electronic novel published by Contentlot.com))
 Skoppensboer (2001) ("Jack of Spades": this refers to a poem by Eugene Marais, that calls the grim reaper by this name)
 Palindroom (2008) ("Palindrome")
 Kladboek (2008) ("Notebook")

Criticism
 Psigoanalise en lees (1989) ("Psychoanalysis and reading")
 Postmodernisme (1995) ("Postmodernism")

References

External links
 Joan Hambidge (1956 – )Sanlam ATKV LitNet Afrikaanse Album
 Murray La Vita: Die krokodil en die brose glimlag
 Louise Viljoen: Onderhoud met Joan Hambidge oor En skielik is dit aand
 Desperately seeking Susan Sontag: ’n essay-verhaal
 Globalisering en die Afrikaanse letterkunde
 Hibriditeit en die internet
 Die hipnose van die digkuns: TT Cloete-gedenklesing

1956 births
Living people
People from Aliwal North
Afrikaner people
Afrikaans-language poets
South African LGBT poets
South African women poets
Academic staff of the University of Cape Town
University of Cape Town alumni
Stellenbosch University alumni
University of Pretoria alumni
Rhodes University alumni
Academic staff of the University of Limpopo